Putz or Pütz is a Hungarian surname. Notable people with the name include:

Amanda Putz (born 1975), Canadian radio presenter
Eduard Pütz (1911–2000), German composer
Erny Putz (1917–1995), Luxembourg fencer
Hans Putz (1920–1990), Austrian actor
J. J. Putz (born 1977), American baseball player
Jean Pütz (born 1936), German science journalist
Kelsey Kollen-Putz (born 1980), American softball player
Leo Putz (1869–1940), Tyrolean painter

See also
Kevin Puts

References 

Hungarian-language surnames